The 2018 AFC Champions League knockout stage was played from 7 May to 10 November 2018. A total of 16 teams competed in the knockout stage to decide the champions of the 2018 AFC Champions League.

Qualified teams
The winners and runners-up of each of the eight groups in the group stage advanced to the round of 16, with both West Region (Groups A–D) and East Region (Groups E–H) having eight qualified teams.

Format

In the knockout stage, the 16 teams played a single-elimination tournament, with the teams split into the two regions until the final. Each tie was played on a home-and-away two-legged basis. The away goals rule, extra time (away goals do not apply in extra time) and penalty shoot-out were used to decide the winner if necessary (Regulations Article 11.3).

Schedule
The schedule of each round was as follows. Matches in the West Region were played on Mondays and Tuesdays, while matches in the East Region were played on Tuesdays and Wednesdays.

Bracket
The bracket of the knockout stage was determined as follows:

The bracket was decided after the draw for the quarter-finals, which was held on 23 May 2018, 16:00 MYT (UTC+8), at the AFC House in Kuala Lumpur, Malaysia.

Round of 16

Summary

In the round of 16, the winners of one group played the runners-up of another group from the same region, with the group winners hosting the second leg, and the matchups determined by the group stage draw.

|+West Region

|+East Region

West Region

4–4 on aggregate. Persepolis won on away goals.

Al-Sadd won 4–3 on aggregate.

Esteghlal won 3–2 on aggregate.

Al-Duhail won 8–3 on aggregate.

East Region

2–2 on aggregate. Tianjin Quanjian won on away goals.

Jeonbuk Hyundai Motors won 4–3 on aggregate.

Suwon Samsung Bluewings won 3–1 on aggregate.

Kashima Antlers won 4–3 on aggregate.

Quarter-finals

Summary

The draw for the quarter-finals was held on 23 May 2018. In the quarter-finals, the four teams from the West Region played in two ties, and the four teams from the East Region played in two ties, with the matchups and order of legs decided by draw, without any seeding or country protection.

|+West Region

|+East Region

West Region

Al-Sadd won 5–3 on aggregate.

Persepolis won 3–2 on aggregate.

East Region

Kashima Antlers won 5–0 on aggregate.

3–3 on aggregate. Suwon Samsung Bluewings won 4–2 on penalties.

Semi-finals

Summary

In the semi-finals, the two quarter-final winners from the West Region played each other, and the two quarter-final winners from the East Region played each other, with the order of legs determined by the quarter-final draw.

|+West Region

|+East Region

West Region

Persepolis won 2–1 on aggregate.

East Region

Kashima Antlers won 6–5 on aggregate.

Final

In the final, the two semi-final winners played each other, with the order of legs (first leg hosted by team from the East Region, second leg hosted by team from the West Region) reversed from the previous season's final.

Kashima Antlers won 2–0 on aggregate.

Notes

References

External links
, the-AFC.com
AFC Champions League 2018, stats.the-AFC.com

3
May 2018 sports events in Asia
August 2018 sports events in Asia
September 2018 sports events in Asia
October 2018 sports events in Asia
November 2018 sports events in Asia